The classification rounds of the 2013 FIBA Asia Championship are games of the 2013 FIBA Asia Championship in the Philippines to determine the final rankings of teams ranked 9th and below. Games, which will be held from August 5 to 11, are held in the Mall of Asia Arena in Pasay and in the Ninoy Aquino Stadium in nearby Manila.

There are two classification rounds, both single-elimination tournaments: for 13th and 9th places. The classification for 13th place involves teams that finished last in the preliminary round. Since there were only three teams in Group B, the fourth-placed team in Group A received a bye to the 13th place playoff, with the loser between the teams from Groups C and D ranked 15th place.

For the classification for 9th place, teams that finished fifth and sixth in the second round participate. The losers in the first round play for 11th place, while the winners place 9th place.

For classification for 8th place and better, see 2013 FIBA Asia Championship final round.

Classification 13th–15th
These are the teams that finished last in their respective preliminary round groups.

Semifinal

|-
|4 ||align=left|Eng Heng Soo || 27:33 || 5-14 || 36 || 2-6 || 33 || 7-7 || 100 || 1 || 2 || 3 || 2 || 3 || 1 || 0 || 5 || 19
|-
|5 ||align=left|Sing Tee Ng || 10:46 || 1-3 || 33 || 1-3 || 33 || 0-0 || 0 || 0 || 1 || 1 || 0 || 1 || 2 || 0 || 3 || 3
|-
|6 ||align=left|Wee Seng Wong || 06:01 || 1-1 || 100 || 1-1 || 100 || 0-0 || 0 || 0 || 1 || 1 || 0 || 0 || 0 || 0 || 0 || 3
|-
|7 ||align=left|Wei Hong Choo || 05:17 || 1-2 || 50 || 0-0 || 0 || 0-0 || 0 || 0 || 2 || 2 || 0 || 0 || 0 || 0 || 2 || 2 
|-
|8 ||align=left|Ban Sin Ooi || 23:07 || 1-9 || 11 || 0-3 || 0 || 3-4 || 75 || 0 || 3 || 3 || 2 || 5 || 0 || 0 || 3 || 5
|-
|9 ||align=left|Wen Keong Tong || 22:16 || 2-9 || 22 || 2-4 || 50 || 0-0 || 0 || 1 || 0 || 1 || 3 || 4 || 0 || 0 || 0 || 6
|-
|10 ||align=left|Hong Hoong Gan || 24:56 || 2-8 || 25 || 2-6 || 33 || 0-0 || 0 || 0 || 1 || 1 || 1 || 2 || 1 || 0 || 3 || 6
|-
|11 ||align=left|Tian Yuan Kuek || 22:59 || 1-5 || 20 || 1-1 || 100 || 0-0 || 0 || 0 || 2 || 2 || 0 || 2 || 0 || 1 || 3 || 3
|-
|13 ||align=left|Chin Yong Wong || 29:33 || 2-7 || 29 || 1-4 || 25 || 0-0 || 0 || 3 || 6 || 9 || 2 || 1 || 0 || 1 || 4 || 5
|-
|14 ||align=left|Lok Seng Mak || 09:11 || 2-2 || 100 || 0-0 || 0 || 0-2 || 0 || 0 || 0 || 0 || 0 || 1 || 0 || 0 || 2 || 4
|-
|15 ||align=left|Min Joe Foong || 18:14 || 0-2 || 0 || 0-0 || 0 || 0-0 || 0 || 1 || 4 || 5 || 1 || 0 || 0 || 2 || 4 || 0
|-
|align=left colspan=2|Totals || || 18-62 || 29 || 10-28 || 36 || 10-13 || 77 || 6 || 22 || 28 || 11 || 19 || 4 || 4 || 29 || 56
|}

|-
|4 ||align=left|Chanachon Klahan || 06:51 || 1-1 || 100 || 1-1 || 100 || 1-2 || 50 || 0 || 1 || 1 || 0 || 0 || 1 || 0 || 0 || 4
|-
|5 ||align=left|Attaporn Lertmalaiporn || 19:32 || 5-6 || 83 || 1-2 || 50 || 0-0 || 0 || 1 || 1 || 2 || 2 || 5 || 1 || 0 || 1 || 11 
|-
|6 ||align=left|Wattana Suttisin || 31:20 || 4-7 || 57 || 0-1 || 0 || 5-9 || 56 || 2 || 3 || 5 || 2 || 0 || 1 || 1 || 1 || 13
|-
|7 ||align=left|Danai Kongkum || 19:16 || 0-1 || 0 || 0-0 || 0 || 1-2 || 50 || 0 || 3 || 3 || 2 || 3 || 0 || 0 || 3 || 1
|-
|8 ||align=left|Wutipong Dasom || 14:16 || 1-5 || 20 || 0-0 || 0 || 0-2 || 0 || 0 || 2 || 2 || 1 || 3 || 0 || 0 || 1 || 2
|-
|9 ||align=left|Anasawee Klaewnarong || 16:18 || 6-12 || 50 || 2-3 || 67 || 2-4 || 50 || 0 || 3 || 3 || 0 || 1 || 1 || 0 || 2 || 16
|-
|10 ||align=left|Darongpan Apiromvilaichai || 14:27 || 0-4 || 0 || 0-0 || 0 || 5-8 || 63 || 2 || 1 || 3 || 1 || 0 || 0 || 0 || 0 || 5
|-
|11 ||align=left|Darunpong Apiromvilaichai || 17:16 || 1-6 || 17 || 0-1 || 0 || 0-0 || 0 || 1 || 4 || 5 || 0 || 5 || 1 || 0 || 1 || 2
|-
|12 ||align=left|Sukhdave Ghogar || 07:39 || 0-4 || 0 || 0-0 || 0 || 0-0 || 0 || 2 || 0 || 2 || 0 || 2 || 2 || 0 || 3 || 0
|-
|13 ||align=left|Kannawat Lertlaokul || 20:16 || 1-2 || 50 || 1-1 || 100 || 0-0 || 0 || 1 || 3 || 4 || 1 || 2 || 0 || 0 || 1 || 3
|-
|14 ||align=left|Kannut Samerjai || 01:57 || 0-0 || 0 || 0-0 || 0 || 2-4 || 50 || 0 || 2 || 2 || 0 || 0 || 0 || 0 || 0 || 2
|-
|15 ||align=left|Wacharapong Tongsri || 30:48 || 3-8 || 38 || 0-0 || 0 || 6-8 || 75 || 4 || 12 || 16 || 1 || 1 || 0 || 0 || 1 || 12
|-
|align=left colspan=2|Totals || || 22-56 || 39 || 5-9 || 56 || 22-39 || 56 || 13 || 35 || 48 || 10 || 22 || 7 || 1 || 14 || 71
|}

13th place

|-
|4 ||align=left|Mohammed Al-Marwani || 26:17 || 5-7 || 71 || 0-0 || 0 || 1-2 || 50 || 4 || 2 || 6 || 1 || 2 || 0 || 0 || 5 || 11
|-
|5 ||align=left|Marzouq Al-Muwallad || 36:16 || 6-11 || 55 || 2-4 || 50 || 6-11 || 55 || 0 || 2 || 2 || 10 || 3 || 1 || 0 || 3 || 20
|-
|6 ||align=left|Mohammed Al-Sager || 14:30 || 3-6 || 50 || 1-2 || 50 || 0-0 || 0 || 1 || 1 || 2 || 4 || 1 || 1 || 0 || 3 || 7
|-
|7 ||align=left|Jaber Kabe || 21:08 || 4-7 || 57 || 0-3 || 0 || 0-0 || 0 || 1 || 5 || 6 || 2 || 4 || 1 || 0 || 3 || 8
|-
|8 ||align=left|Fahad Belal || 30:00 || 6-15 || 40 || 3-12 || 25 || 6-6 || 100 || 0 || 4 || 4 || 2 || 2 || 1 || 0 || 2 || 21
|-
|9 ||align=left|Mustafa Al-Hwsawi || 34:43 || 2-5 || 40 || 1-2 || 50 || 2-4 || 50 || 0 || 1 || 1 || 2 || 0 || 0 || 0 || 1 || 7
|-
|10 ||align=left|Mohammed Abujabal || colspan=16 align=left|Did not play
|-
|11 ||align=left|Turki Al-Muhanna || colspan=16 align=left|Did not play
|-
|12 ||align=left|Mathna Al-Marwani || 07:35 || 2-4 || 50 || 0-0 || 0 || 1-1 || 100 || 0 || 1 || 1 || 0 || 1 || 0 || 0 || 0 || 5
|-
|13 ||align=left|Ahmed Al-Mukhtar || colspan=16 align=left|Did not play
|-
|14 ||align=left|Ayman Al-Muwallad  || 22:02 || 3-8 || 38 || 1-3 || 33 || 5-7 || 71 || 1 || 3 || 4 || 3 || 3 || 0 || 0 || 4 || 12
|-
|15 ||align=left|Nassir Abo Jalas || 07:26 || 1-4 || 25 || 0-0 || 0 || 0-0 || 0 || 1 || 2 || 3 || 1 || 0 || 0 || 0 || 1 || 2
|-
|align=left colspan=2|Totals || || 32-67 || 48 || 8-26 || 31 || 21-31 || 68 || 8 || 21 || 29 || 25 || 16 || 4 || 0 || 22 || 93
|}

|-
|4 ||align=left|Chanachon Klahan || 16:06 || 3-9 || 33 || 2-5 || 40 || 0-0 || 0 || 1 || 4 || 5 || 0 || 0 || 0 || 0 || 3 || 8
|-
|5 ||align=left|Attaporn Lertmalaiporn || 31:06 || 4-7 || 57 || 1-3 || 33 || 6-6 || 100 || 1 || 5 || 6 || 1 || 8 || 3 || 0 || 2 || 15
|-
|6 ||align=left|Wattana Suttisin || colspan=16 align=left|Did not play
|-
|7 ||align=left|Danai Kongkum || 04:16 || 0-0 || 0 || 0-0 || 0 || 0-0 || 0 || 0 || 0 || 0 || 1 || 1 || 0 || 0 || 1 || 0
|-
|8 ||align=left|Wutipong Dasom || 24:04 || 4-8 || 50 || 0-1 || 0 || 1-2 || 50 || 1 || 3 || 4 || 2 || 1 || 2 || 1 || 3 || 9
|-
|9 ||align=left|Anasawee Klaewnarong || 23:53 || 6-12 || 50 || 0-2 || 0 || 3-6 || 50 || 0 || 2 || 2 || 3 || 2 || 1 || 0 || 2 || 15
|-
|10 ||align=left|Darongpan Apiromvilaichai || 15:55 || 2-4 || 50 || 0-0 || 0 || 3-4 || 75 || 1 || 1 || 2 || 0 || 2 || 0 || 0 || 1 || 7
|-
|11 ||align=left|Darunpong Apiromvilaichai || 20:02 || 2-6 || 33 || 1-3 || 33 || 1-2 || 50 || 0 || 4 || 4 || 2 || 4 || 0 || 1 || 4 || 6
|-
|12 ||align=left|Sukhdave Ghogar || 20:26 || 2-4 || 50 || 0-0 || 0 || 4-4 || 100 || 3 || 1 || 4 || 1 || 2 || 1 || 0 || 5 || 8
|-
|13 ||align=left|Kannawat Lertlaokul || 09:29 || 0-2 || 0 || 0-2 || 0 || 0-0 || 0 || 2 || 0 || 2 || 2 || 3 || 0 || 0 || 1 || 0
|-
|14 ||align=left|Kannut Samerjai || colspan=16 align=left|Did not play
|-
|15 ||align=left|Wacharapong Tongsri || 34:39 || 6-12 || 50 || 0-0 || 0 || 0-1 || 0 || 2 || 5 || 7 || 2 || 2 || 0 || 3 || 4 || 12 
|-
|align=left colspan=2|Totals || || 29-64 || 45 || 4-16 || 25 || 18-25 || 72 || 11 || 25 || 36 || 14 || 25 || 7 || 5 || 26 || 80
|}

Classification 9th–12th
These are the teams that finished fifth and sixth in their respective second round groups.

Semifinals

Bahrain vs. Hong Kong

|-
|4 ||align=left|Mohamed Ebrahim || colspan=16 align=left|Did not play
|-
|5 ||align=left|Hussain Al-Tawash || 38:39 || 9-14 || 64 || 3-6 || 50 || 8-9 || 89 || 0 || 5 || 5 || 4 || 1 || 0 || 0 || 3 || 29
|-
|6 ||align=left|Mohamed Kawaid || 33:28 || 6-11 || 55 || 1-3 || 33 || 1-2 || 50 || 1 || 4 || 5 || 5 || 1 || 1 || 1 || 0 || 14
|-
|7 ||align=left|Bader Malabes || colspan=16 align=left|Did not play 
|-
|8 ||align=left|Ahmed Ismaeel || colspan=16 align=left|Did not play
|-
|9 ||align=left|Mohamed Alderazi || 29:36 || 6-11 || 55 || 4-9 || 44 || 0-0 || 0 || 1 || 2 || 3 || 2 || 4 || 0 || 0 || 4 || 16
|-
|10 ||align=left|Abdul-Rahman Mubarak || 24:52 || 4-7 || 57 || 3-6 || 50 || 0-0 || 0 || 0 || 1 || 1 || 4 || 1 || 0 || 0 || 0 || 11
|-
|11 ||align=left|Subah Azzam || 25:06 || 2-4 || 50 || 0-0 || 0 || 0-0 || 0 || 1 || 1 || 2 || 0 || 1 || 0 || 0 || 2 || 4
|-
|12 ||align=left|Chester Giles || colspan=16 align=left|Did not play
|-
|13 ||align=left|Yunes Kawaid || 16:28 || 0-3 || 0 || 0-0 || 0 || 0-0 || 0 || 0 || 0 || 0 || 1 || 3 || 1 || 0 || 1 || 0
|-
|14 ||align=left|Ahmed Akber || 31:48 || 2-2 || 100 || 0-0 || 0 || 1-2 || 50 || 2 || 1 || 3 || 1 || 1 || 1 || 1 || 4 || 5
|-
|15 ||align=left|Ahmed Aman || colspan=16 align=left|Did not play
|-
|align=left colspan=2|Totals || || 29-52 || 56 || 11-24 || 46 || 10-13 || 77 || 5 || 14 || 19 || 17 || 12 || 3 || 2 || 14 || 79
|}

|-
|4 ||align=left|Man Chun Lam || 17:11 || 3-5 || 60 || 1-1 || 100 || 4-4 || 100 || 3 || 2 || 5 || 2 || 1 || 0 || 0 || 1 || 11
|-
|5 ||align=left|Tsz Lai Lau || 05:57 || 1-3 || 33 || 1-3 || 33 || 0-0 || 0 || 1 || 0 || 1 || 0 || 0 || 0 || 0 || 1 || 3
|-
|6 ||align=left|Ki Lee || 24:04 || 5-13 || 38 || 4-10 || 40 || 2-2 || 100 || 1 || 3 || 4 || 1 || 0 || 0 || 0 || 2 || 16
|-
|7 ||align=left|Kim Wong Li || 28:24 || 4-7 || 57 || 3-5 || 60 || 1-2 || 50 || 1 || 3 || 4 || 3 || 0 || 0 || 0 || 3 || 12
|-
|8 ||align=left|Siu Wing Chan || 17:05 || 1-4 || 25 || 1-4 || 25 || 2-2 || 100 || 1 || 0 || 1 || 3 || 1 || 0 || 0 || 3 || 5
|-
|9 ||align=left|Tung Leung Lau || 03:21 || 0-0 || 0 || 0-0 || 0 || 0-0 || 0 || 0 || 1 || 1 || 1 || 1 || 0 || 0 || 0 || 0
|-
|10 ||align=left|Yik Lun Chan || 09:58 || 1-4 || 25 || 0-3 || 0 || 0-0 || 0 || 0 || 0 || 0 || 2 || 1 || 0 || 0 || 0 || 2
|-
|11 ||align=left|Chi Ho Poon || colspan=16 align=left|Did not play
|-
|12 ||align=left|Shing Yee Fong || |36:38 || 6-14 || 43 || 0-0 || 0 || 1-1 || 100 || 6 || 6 || 12 || 5 || 0 || 2 || 0 || 1 || 13
|-
|13 ||align=left|Chun Wai Wong || 19:35 || 1-3 || 33 || 1-2 || 50 || 2-3 || 67 || 0 || 0 || 0 || 1 || 0 || 0 || 0 || 0 || 5
|-
|14 ||align=left|Duncan Overbeck Reid || 37:43 || 10-14 || 71 || 0-0 || 0 || 0-1 || 0 || 6 || 1 || 7 || 3 || 5 || 0 || 0 || 3 || 20
|-
|15 ||align=left|Wai Kit Szeto || colspan=16 align=left|Did not play
|-
|align=left colspan=2|Totals || || 32-67 || 48 || 11-28 || 39 || 12-15 || 80 || 19 || 16 || 35 || 21 || 9 || 2 || 0 || 14 || 87
|}

Japan vs. India

|-
|4 ||align=left|Keijuro Matsui ||7:23||1-4||25||1-4||25||0-0||0||0||0||0||1||0||0||0||0||3
|-
|5 ||align=left|Daiki Tanaka ||23:35||4-8||50||0-2||0||1-1||100||0||3||3||1||0||1||0||0||9 
|-
|6 ||align=left|Makoto Hiejima ||19:37||5-9||56||0-0||0||0-0||0||0||3||3||1||3||4||1||0||10 
|-
|7 ||align=left|Atsuya Ota ||14:35||3-5||60||0-0||0||4-6||67||3||1||4||0||1||0||0||0||10 
|-
|8 ||align=left|Yuta Watanabe ||00:09||1-1||100||0-0||0||0-0||0||0||0||0||0||0||0||0||0||2 
|-
|9 ||align=left|Takahiro Kurihara ||09:23||0-2||0||0-1||0||0-0||0||0||0||0||0||1||1||0||0||0 
|-
|10 ||align=left|Kosuke Takeuchi ||34:02||4-11||36||0-1||0||4-4||100||1||5||6||1||4||2||0||2||12 
|-
|11 ||align=left|Ryota Sakurai ||20:00||1-4||25||0-1||0||0-0||0||2||2||4||3||0||0||0||0||2
|-
|12 ||align=left|J.R. Sakuragi ||27:41||3-5||60||0-0||0||4-9||44||1||10||11||4||2||3||3||1||10 
|-
|13 ||align=left|Naoto Tsuji ||23:22||3-8||38||1-4||25||5-6||83||0||1||1||3||3||0||1||1||12 
|-
|14 ||align=left|Kosuke Kanamaru ||16:37||0-5||0||0-3||0||0-0||0||0||4||4||1||1||0||0||0||0 
|-
|15 ||align=left|Hiroshi Ichioka ||03:31||1-2||50||0-0||0||1-1||100||1||0||1||0||1||0||0||0||3 
|-
|align=left colspan=2|Totals || ||26-64||41||2-16||13||19-27||70||8||29||37||15||16||11||5||4||73
|}

|-
|4 ||align=left|Sambhaji Kadam || colspan=16 align=left|Did not play 
|-
|5 ||align=left|Narender Kumar Grewal ||21:37||1-5||20||0-1||0||4-4||100||0||1||1||0||2||1||0||0||6 
|-
|6 ||align=left|Pratham Singh ||29:09||1-4||25||1-3||33||1-2||50||0||3||3||0||1||1||0||0||4 
|-
|7 ||align=left|Vinay Kaushik || colspan=16 align=left|Did not play  
|-
|8 ||align=left|Arjun Singh || colspan=16 align=left|Did not play 
|-
|9 ||align=left|Vishesh Bhriguvanshi ||35:33||4-12||33||2-6||33||2-2||100||0||8||8||6||2||3||3||0||12 
|-
|10 ||align=left|Amritpal Singh ||10:04||3-5||60||0-0||0||0-1||0||1||0||1||0|5||1||0||0||6 
|-
|11 ||align=left|Joginder Singh ||33:39||4-9||44||1-5||20||0-0||0||1||4||5||3||2||4||0||0||9 
|-
|12 ||align=left|Satnam Singh Bhamara || colspan=16 align=left|Did not play  
|-
|13 ||align=left|Amjyot Singh ||20:58||3-10||30||0-2||0||3-5||60||4||3||7||0||4||3||3||1||9 
|-
|14 ||align=left|Yadwinder Singh ||15:26||2-5||40||1-3||33||2-2||100||1||3||4||1||4||2||0||0||7 
|-
|15 ||align=left|Rikin Shantilal Pethani ||33:30||5-10||50||0-1||0||1-2||50||2||6||8||0||4||4||0||0||11 
|-
|align=left colspan=2|Totals || ||23-60||38||5-21||24||13-18||72||9||28||37||10||24||19||6||1||64
|}

11th place

|-
|4 ||align=left|Sambhaji Kadam ||colspan=16 align=left|Did not play
|-
|5 ||align=left|Narender Kumar Grewal ||08:21 ||0-2 ||0 ||0-2 ||0 ||0-0 ||0 ||0 ||1 ||1 ||1 ||1 ||0 ||0 ||0 ||0
|-
|6 ||align=left|Pratham Singh ||39:09 ||6-12 ||50 ||2-8 ||25 ||2-2 ||100 ||1 ||1 ||2 ||2 ||3 ||1 ||0 ||0 ||16
|-00
|7 ||align=left|Vinay Kaushik ||02:38 ||0-0 ||0 ||0-0 ||0 ||2-2 ||100 ||0 ||0 ||0 ||0 ||0 ||0 ||1 ||0 ||2 
|-
|8 ||align=left|Arjun Singh ||01:53 ||0-1 ||0 ||0-0 ||0 ||1-2 ||50 ||1 ||0 ||1 ||0 ||0 ||1 ||0 ||0 ||1
|-
|9 ||align=left|Vishesh Bhriguvanshi ||37:07 ||4-8 ||50 ||1-2 ||50 ||10-15 ||67 ||4 ||3 ||7 ||4 ||2 ||2 ||0 ||0 ||19
|-
|10 ||align=left|Amritpal Singh ||03:35 ||1-1 ||100 ||0-0 ||0 ||0-0 ||0 ||1 ||1 ||2 ||0 ||5 ||3 ||0 ||0 ||2
|-
|11 ||align=left|Joginder Singh ||27:35 ||1-8 ||13 ||1-7 ||14 ||4-6 ||67 ||0 ||1 ||1 ||1 ||4 ||1 ||0 ||0 ||7
|-
|12 ||align=left|Satnam Singh Bhamara ||08:25 ||3-4 ||75 ||0-0 ||0 ||0-0 ||0 ||2 ||2 ||4 ||0 ||1 ||2 ||0 ||0 ||6
|-
|13 ||align=left|Amjyot Singh ||20:39 ||2-7 ||29 ||0-0 ||0 ||5-5 ||100 ||2 ||5 ||7 ||0 ||5 ||1 ||0 ||2 ||9
|-
|14 ||align=left|Yadwinder Singh ||22:35 ||2-7 ||29 ||0-1 ||0 ||3-4 ||75 ||2 ||5 ||7 ||0 ||2 ||1 ||0 ||2 ||7
|-
|15 ||align=left|Rikin Shantilal Pethani ||27:58 ||2-7 ||29 ||0-0 ||0 ||2-2 ||100 ||1 ||7 ||8 ||2 ||3 ||1 ||0 ||0 ||6
|-
|align=left colspan=2|Totals || ||21-57 ||37 ||4-20 ||20 ||29-38 ||76 ||14 ||26 ||40 ||10 ||26 ||13 ||1 ||4 ||75
|}

|-
|4 ||align=left|Mohamed Ebrahim ||colspan=16 align=left|Did not play
|-
|5 ||align=left|Hussain Al-Tawash ||40:00 ||7-18 ||39 ||2-6 ||33 ||4-4 ||100 ||2 ||5 ||7 ||6 ||4 ||5 ||0 ||0 ||20
|-
|6 ||align=left|Mohamed Kawaid ||11:37 ||2-4 ||50 ||0-0 ||0 ||0-1 ||0 ||0 ||1 ||1 ||0 ||2 ||0 ||1 ||0 ||4
|-
|7 ||align=left|Bader Malabes ||colspan=16 align=left|Did not play
|-
|8 ||align=left|Ahmed Ismaeel ||colspan=16 align=left|Did not play
|-
|9 ||align=left|Mohamed Alderazi ||28:44 ||4-9 ||44 ||1-4 ||25 ||2-3 ||67 ||1 ||8 ||9 ||0 ||4 ||2 ||0 ||0 ||11
|-
|10 ||align=left|Abdul-Rahman Mubarak ||24:58 ||2-7 ||29 ||1-3 ||33 ||0-0 ||0 ||0 ||2 ||2 ||0 ||5 ||2 ||1 ||0 ||5
|-
|11 ||align=left|Subah Azzam ||28:22 ||1-1 ||100 ||0-0 ||0 ||6-8 ||75 ||2 ||5 ||7 ||2 ||4 ||2 ||1 ||2 ||8
|-
|12 ||align=left|Chester Giles ||colspan=16 align=left|Did not play
|-
|13 ||align=left|Yunes Kawaid ||34:25 ||5-14 ||36 ||0-0 ||0 ||2-3 ||67 ||2 ||4 ||6 ||1 ||3 ||0 ||0 ||0 ||12
|-
|14 ||align=left|Ahmed Akber ||31:28 ||2-3 ||67 ||0-0 ||0 ||1-6 ||17 ||3 ||2 ||5 ||0 ||5 ||2 ||1 ||5 ||5
|-
|15 ||align=left|Ahmed Aman ||00:22 ||0-0 ||0 ||0-0 ||0 ||0-0 ||0 ||0 ||0 ||0 ||0 ||0 ||0 ||0 ||0 ||0
|-
|align=left colspan=2|Totals || ||23-56 ||41 ||4-13 ||31 ||15-25 ||60 ||10 ||27 ||37 ||9 ||27 ||13 ||4 ||7 ||65
|}

9th place

|-
|4 ||align=left|Man Chun Lam ||08:21 ||0-1 ||0 ||0-1 ||0 ||0-0 ||0 ||2 ||2 ||4 ||0 ||2 ||0 ||0 ||0 ||0
|-
|5 ||align=left|Tsz Lai Lau ||06:48 ||0-1 ||0 ||0-1 ||0 ||0-0 ||0 ||0 ||0 ||0 ||0 ||1 ||2 ||0 ||0 ||0
|-
|6 ||align=left|Ki Lee ||21:21 ||2-8 ||25 ||1-6 ||17 ||3-4 ||75 ||0 ||1 ||1 ||0 ||1 ||4 ||1 ||0 ||8
|-00
|7 ||align=left|Kim Wong Li ||25:15 ||2-5 ||40 ||1-3 ||33 ||3-4 ||75 ||3 ||2 ||5 ||5 ||4 ||5 ||2 ||0 ||8
|-
|8 ||align=left|Siu Wing Chan ||28:01 ||1-7 ||14 ||0-4 ||0 ||0-2 ||0 ||1 ||2 ||3 ||2 ||1 ||5 ||0 ||0 ||2
|-
|9 ||align=left|Tung Leung Lau ||20:07 ||2-6 ||33 ||0-0 ||0 ||2-4 ||50 ||2 ||5 ||7 ||1 ||2 ||0 ||0 ||0 ||6
|-
|10 ||align=left|Yik Lun Chan ||23:01 ||2-8 ||25 ||1-5 ||20 ||0-0 ||0 ||1 ||2 ||3 ||2 ||1 ||4 ||0 ||0 ||5
|-
|11 ||align=left|Chi Ho Poon ||colspan=16 align=left|Did not play
|-
|12 ||align=left|Shing Yee Fong ||colspan=16 align=left|Did not play
|-
|13 ||align=left|Chun Wai Wong ||19:21 ||1-4 ||25 ||0-2 ||0 ||0-0 ||0 ||2 ||1 ||3 ||1 ||3 ||2 ||0 ||0 ||2
|-
|14 ||align=left|Duncan Overbeck Reid ||38:45 ||8-16 ||50 ||0-1 ||0 ||2-3 ||67 ||5 ||8 ||13 ||1 ||2 ||2 ||0 ||1 ||18
|-
|15 ||align=left|Wai Kit Szeto ||08:55 ||0-1 ||0 ||0-0 ||0 ||1-2 ||50 ||1 ||1 ||2 ||0 ||0 ||0 ||0 ||0 ||1
|-
|align=left colspan=2|Totals || ||18-57 ||32 ||3-23 ||13 ||11-19 ||58 ||17 ||24 ||41 ||12 ||17 ||24 ||3 ||1 ||50
|}

|-
|4 ||align=left|Keijuro Matsui ||10:14 ||1-3 ||33 ||0-1 ||0 ||0-0 ||0 ||0 ||0 ||0 ||1 ||0 ||0 ||0 ||0 ||2
|-
|5 ||align=left|Daiki Tanaka ||09:24 ||0-1 ||0 ||0-1 ||0 ||0-0 ||0 ||0 ||0 ||0 ||0 ||0 ||0 ||0 ||0 ||0
|-
|6 ||align=left|Makoto Hiejima ||13:44 ||1-5 ||20 ||0-1 ||0 ||0-0 ||0 ||1 ||0 ||1 ||2 ||2 ||1 ||1 ||0 ||2
|-
|7 ||align=left|Atsuya Ota ||18:42 ||7-8 ||88 ||0-0 ||0 ||1-2 ||50 ||3 ||6 ||9 ||3 ||3 ||0 ||0 ||0 ||15
|-
|8 ||align=left|Yuta Watanabe ||21:32 ||5-10 ||50 ||0-2 ||0 ||3-3 ||100 ||0 ||4 ||4 ||1 ||0 ||3 ||1 ||1 ||13
|-
|9 ||align=left|Takahiro Kurihara ||15:32 ||1-2 ||50 ||0-1 ||0 ||0-0 ||0 ||1 ||3 ||4 ||1 ||3 ||2 ||1 ||0 ||2
|-
|10 ||align=left|Kosuke Takeuchi ||26:13 ||0-6 ||0 ||0-0 ||0 ||2-2 ||100 ||2 ||6 ||8 ||3 ||2 ||0 ||0 ||0 ||2
|-
|11 ||align=left|Ryota Sakurai ||19:35 ||1-3 ||33 ||0-1 ||0 ||2-2 ||100 ||0 ||1 ||1 ||1 ||3 ||2 ||1 ||0 ||4
|-
|12 ||align=left|J.R. Sakuragi ||01:42 ||0-0 ||0 ||0-0 ||0 ||0-0 ||0 ||0 ||0 ||0 ||0 ||1 ||0 ||0 ||0 ||0
|-
|13 ||align=left|Naoto Tsuji ||15:02 ||2-3 ||67 ||0-1 ||0 ||0-0 ||0 ||0 ||2 ||2 ||4 ||0 ||1 ||1 ||0 ||4
|-
|14 ||align=left|Kosuke Kanamaru ||34:00 ||11-18 ||61 ||3-6 ||50 ||0-0 ||0 ||0 ||0 ||0 ||0 ||2 ||2 ||1 ||0 ||25
|-
|15 ||align=left|Hiroshi Ichioka ||14:15 ||5-10 ||50 ||0-0 ||0 ||0-0 ||0 ||5 ||3 ||8 ||0 ||2 ||0 ||1 ||0 ||10
|-
|align=left colspan=2|Totals || ||34-69 ||49 ||3-14 ||21 ||8-9 ||89 ||12 ||25 ||37 ||16 ||18 ||11 ||7 ||1 ||79
|}

2013 FIBA Asia Championship